Amal Al-Agroobi is an Emirati documentary filmmaker, director, producer and writer. Her career as a director began in 2012. Her first short documentary Half Emirati premiered at Dubai Film Festival. Half Emirati became the most watched film in the festival.  She was adjudged the best new director in UAE by Women in Film and Television. By professional training she is a neuroscientist. She is also founder and owner of the production company ALAGROOBI Films. She has raised money for most of her films through crowdfunding.

Early life
Amal Al-Agroobi grew up around Europe, completing her BSc in Biomedical Sciences from University of Durham and MSc in Neurosciences from University College London.

While in London, she obtained a certificate in short film production, certificate in acting for film and continued gaining experience in TVC's and feature films.

Career
Amal Al-Agroobi began her cinema career as a director. Her directorial debut was Half Emirati, a short film that was released in 2012. The film was produced by her own production company Alagroobi films UAE. Half Emirati, which is a documentary was screened in both the Dubai International Film Festival and the Gulf Film Festival.

Her next critically acclaimed project was The Brain That Sings.  The movie received Emirates NBD People's Choice Award in December 2013 at the Dubai International Film Festival.  She completed a goodwill documentary for The PCRF charity Climb of Hope, and it was released in 2015.

She has also acted in an episode of The Misfits.
Al-Agroobi's social and humanitarian work caused her to work on a TV-web series titled "Proud to be a Sharjonian", showing off her hometown of Sharjah.

Her first fictional narrative short movie will be released in 2016 titled "Under the Hat". The film was the winner of Doha Film Institute grant for the category short movies.

In 2014, her life story was published in a book titled "Those Who inspire" showcasing 60 inspiring Emiratis and again in 2015 in a coffee-table book labeled "Emirati Woman Achievers" where she was one of the 21 people who shared their story of inspiration in the middle east.

Awards

References

External links 

Emirati film directors
Emirati film producers
Living people
Year of birth missing (living people)